Guerlain is a French perfume, cosmetics and skincare house, which is among the oldest in the world. Many traditional Guerlain fragrances are characterized by a common olfactory accord known as the "Guerlinade" (fr). The house was founded in Paris in 1828 by the perfumer Pierre-François Pascal Guerlain. It was run by the Guerlain family until 1994, when it was bought by the French multinational company LVMH. Its flagship store is 68, Avenue des Champs-Elysées in Paris.

History

The House of Guerlain was owned and managed by members of the Guerlain family from its inception in 1828 to 1994. It was acquired in 1994 by the LVMH group, a French multinational investment corporation specializing in luxury brands.

Beginning
The House of Guerlain was founded in 1828, when Pierre-François Pascal Guerlain opened his perfume store at 42, rue de Rivoli in Paris. As both the founder and first perfumer of the house, Pierre-François composed and manufactured custom fragrances with the help of his two sons, Aimé and Gabriel. Through continued success and the patronage of members in high society, Guerlain opened its flagship store at 15, rue de la Paix in 1840, and put its mark on the Parisian fashion scene.

The success of the house under Pierre-François peaked in 1853 with the creation of Eau de Cologne Impériale for French Emperor Napoleon III and his Spanish-French wife Empress Eugénie. This perfume earned Pierre-François the prestigious title of being His Majesty's Official Perfumer. Guerlain went on to create perfumes for Queen Victoria of the United Kingdom and Queen Isabella II of Spain, among other royalty.

Second generation
With the death of Pierre-François in 1864, the house was left to his sons Aimé Guerlain and Gabriel Guerlain. The roles of perfumer and manager were divided between the two brothers, with Gabriel managing and further expanding the house, and Aimé becoming the master perfumer. The House of Guerlain thus began a long tradition whereby the position of master perfumer was handed down through the Guerlain family.

As Guerlain's second generation in-house perfumer, Aimé was the creator of many classic compositions, including Fleur d'Italie (1884), Rococo (1887) and Eau de Cologne du Coq (1894). However, many would argue that his greatest composition was 1889's Jicky, the first fragrance described as a "parfum" rather than an eau de cologne, and among the first to use synthetic ingredients alongside natural extracts.

Third generation

The business was handed down to the sons of Gabriel Guerlain: Jacques Guerlain and Pierre Guerlain. Jacques, Aimé's nephew, became Guerlain's third master perfumer; he was the author of many of Guerlain's most famous classics, which are still held in high esteem in the modern perfume industry. Many of his perfumes are still sold and marketed today. Among Jacques Guerlain's most important creations are Mouchoir de Monsieur (1904), Après L'Ondée (1906), L'Heure Bleue (1912), Mitsouko (1919), Guerlain's flagship fragrance Shalimar (1925), and Vol de Nuit (1933). Jacques composed his final perfume, Ode (1955), with the assistance of his grandson, the then-18-year-old Jean-Paul Guerlain.

Fourth generation
Jean-Paul Guerlain was the last family master perfumer. He created Guerlain's classic men's fragrances Vétiver (1959) and Habit Rouge (1965). He also created Chant d'Arômes (1962) and Chamade (1969). From 1975 to 1989, he collaborated with perfumer Anne-Marie Saget, composing Nahema (1979), Jardins de Bagatelle (1983), Derby (1985) and Samsara (1989). His later work includes Héritage (1992), Coriolan (1998) and Vétiver pour Elle (2004). Jean-Paul Guerlain retired in 2002, but continued to serve as advisor to his successor until 2010, when he was terminated after making a racist remark on French television regarding the inspiration for his scent Samsara. With no heir from within the Guerlain family to take over, the role of master perfumer is no longer tied to family succession.

Purchase by the LVMH Group
In a decision widely seen as a break with tradition, the Guerlain family sold the company to the luxury goods conglomerate Moët Hennessy Louis Vuitton (LVMH) in 1994. Though Jean-Paul Guerlain remained as an in-house perfumer until 2002, other perfumers were brought in after 1994 to compose perfumes for Guerlain, and Jean-Paul had to submit his compositions against those of others. Fans of the house viewed the LVMH purchase as a step towards the cheapening and commercialization of the legendary firm's legacy. Most were unhappy with the first post-LVMH release, the 1996 sweet mimosa floral Champs-Elysées, composed by Olivier Cresp, whose entry was selected over that of Jean-Paul Guerlain.

Among the outside perfumers to compose perfumes for the firm after 1994 was Mathilde Laurent, who worked for Guerlain at the end of the 1990s and in the early 2000s. She composed Aqua Allegorica Pamplelune (1999) and Shalimar Light (2003, reattributed to Jean-Paul Guerlain and relaunched in 2004 following reformulation). Maurice Roucel, a perfumer of Symrise, composed L'Instant de Guerlain (2004) and Insolence (2006). As the niece of Jean-Jacques Guerlain, some thought Patricia de Nicolaï would have been a candidate for the position of Guerlain's in-house perfumer, though the presence of a glass ceiling in the company prevented her selection for position.

In May 2008, Thierry Wasser was named the in-house perfumer for Guerlain. Wasser, a Swiss perfumer who used to work for Firmenich, created Iris Ganache (2007) and Quand Vient la Pluie (2007) for Guerlain before his appointment the following year. Jean-Paul Guerlain stayed on in an advisory consultant role, both for fragrance design and ingredients. Wasser was to work closely with Sylvaine Delacourte, Guerlain's Artistic Director. In 2010, the LVMH Group cut ties with Jean-Paul Guerlain as their consultant due to his racist comments on French television.

Russian model Natalia Vodianova has been the face of Guerlain campaigns since 2008. Vodianova began advertising Shalimar to celebrate the perfume house's 180th birthday. For the Fall 2013 makeup collection, Olivier Echaudemaison, Guerlian's Creative Director of Makeup since 2000 commented "Every season we fantasize with Natalia's image and invent for her a new role. For us, it is not just a model, which advertises cosmetics, but above all, a great actress". 
In October 2011, the company named Malaysian actress Michelle Yeoh as a new spokesmodel. Yeoh is an ambassador for the Orchidée Impériale line of skincare.

Products

Guerlain's creations have long influenced the trends of perfumery with fragrances such as Jicky, Shalimar, Vétiver,and La Petite Robe Noire. Guerlain is among the few older houses (such as Caron) that exist solely to produce and market perfumes. Many brands in the perfume industry, such as Chanel and Jean Patou are in fact divisions of fashion houses or multinational conglomerates that license the brand name. Alongside its fragrances, today Guerlain has expanded to offer a large range of makeup and skincare. Guerlain products are available across the world at serviced counters within department stores, and at beauty stores such as fellow LVMH brand Sephora. Guerlain also maintains thirteen international beauty and spa 'boutiques', five within France (two being in Paris).

Perfumes
Since its foundation in 1828, Guerlain has created over 600 fragrances. Among the company's most notable (in terms of longevity, sales or cultural impact) are:

References

Further reading
Collectif, Dictionnaire des parfums - 10e édition 1990–1991, Sermadiras, 1990
Stamelman, R: "Perfume – Joy, Scandal, Sin. A cultural history of fragrance from 1750 to the present day", Rizzoli, 2006
Élisabeth de Feydeau, "Le roman des Guerlain Parfumeurs de Paris", Flammarion, 2017, 363 p. (lire en ligne)
Pierre-Roland Saint-Dizier (scénario), Li-An (dessin), "Guerlain, Le prince des parfums, 1ère époque, Pierre-François-Pascal (1798/1864)", bande dessinée, Glénat, 2018
Laurence Benaïm, "Paris, capitale de Guerlain", Flammarion, 2021

External links

 
 Corporate webpage of LVMH, owner of Guerlain

French culture
Culture of Paris
History of cosmetics
Perfume houses
LVMH brands
French brands
French companies established in 1828
Manufacturing companies established in 1828